Metanarsia guberlica is a moth of the family Gelechiidae. It is found in Russia (the southern Ural). The habitat consists of rocky steppe slopes.

The wingspan is 15.5–16 mm. The forewings are pale reddish brown, with three indistinct dark brown spots. The hindwings are fuscous, but the basal area is paler.

Etymology
The species name refers to the type locality, the Guberlinsky Mountains in the southern Ural range.

References

Moths described in 2010
Metanarsia